John Edmund Mulaney (born August 26, 1982) is an American stand-up comedian, actor, writer and producer. He has received numerous award nominations and wins for his work as a writer, and performer on Saturday Night Live. He is also known for his performance in Documentary Now!. He also received great acclaim for his standup special John Mulaney: Kid Gorgeous at Radio City, for which he won the Primetime Emmy Award for Outstanding Writing for a Variety Special in 2018. He was the creator and star of the short-lived Fox sitcom Mulaney, a semi-autobiographical series about his life. Mulaney also performed as a character called George St. Geegland in a comedic duo with Nick Kroll, most recently in Oh, Hello on Broadway from September 2016 through early 2017. He is also known for his voice acting work as Andrew Glouberman in the Netflix original animated show Big Mouth.

Major awards

Peabody Award

Primetime Emmy Awards

Producers Guild Awards

Writers Guild Awards

Other awards

Dorian Awards

Hollywood Music in Media Awards

MTV Movie & TV Awards

Shorty Awards

References 

Lists of awards received by American actor
Lists of awards received by writer